Piermaria Leso (born 13 June 1991) is an Italian rugby union player.
His usual position is as a Prop and he currently plays for Calvisano in Top12.

In 2010 and 2011, Leso was also named in the Italy Under 20

References

External links
It's Rugby England Profile
All Rugby Profile
ESPN Profile

1991 births
Sportspeople from Verona
Rugby Calvisano players
Living people
Italian rugby union players
Rugby union props